The 2014–15 Saltillo Rancho Seco season was the second international season of the Saltillo Rancho Seco professional indoor soccer club. The Saltillo Rancho Seco, a Central Division team in the Major Arena Soccer League, played their home games at Deportivo Rancho-Seco Saltillo in Saltillo, the capital of the northern Mexican state of Coahuila. 

The team was led by owner/general manager Marco Antonio Davila De Leon and head coach Elizandro Campos with assistant coach Jesus Monroy. Saltillo won only 2 games, both at home, giving them a 2–17 record and leaving them out of the playoffs.

Season summary
Saltillo struggled to find its footing in the MASL and lost the first 8 games of the season. The team finally won a game on January 9 hosting the Dallas Sidekicks at the outdoor Deportivo Rancho-Seco Saltillo amidst freezing fog and frigid temperatures. Saltillo dropped another 8 consecutive games before splitting their final homestand against the Brownsville Barracudas. With the collapse of Hidalgo La Fiera leaving them one game short of the usual 20, Saltillo finished 2–17 and in 5th place in the Southern Division. They did not qualify for post-season play.

History
In 2013, Saltillo became the third team based in Mexico to join the Professional Arena Soccer League. In May 2014, the Professional Arena Soccer League added six refugee teams from the failed third incarnation of the Major Indoor Soccer League and reorganized as the Major Arena Soccer League. 

With the league expansion and reorganization, Saltillo moved from the Central division to the new Southern division. The other Southern teams for 2014–15 are the Brownsville Barracudas, Dallas Sidekicks, Hidalgo La Fiera, Monterrey Flash, and Beaumont-based Oxford City FC of Texas.

For the past four seasons, Saltillo has been a successful member of the Liga Mexicana de Futbol Rápido Profesional (LMFR) and remains a member of both leagues. The team struggled in the 2013–14 PASL season, earning a 6–10 record and failing to qualify for post-season play.

Off-field moves
Revenues from the team's November 28 home opener against the Monterrey Flash were donated in support of the annual Teletón which raises funds for rehabilitation centers for disabled children.

Schedule

Regular season

 Originally scheduled for January 2 but moved forward due to availability and to avoid holiday travel.
 Originally scheduled for November 7 but postponed due to weather.
 Originally scheduled for December 7 but postponed due to scheduling conflicts with the Liga MX semi-finals.
 Originally scheduled for December 14 but postponed due to scheduling conflicts with the Liga MX finals.
 Rescheduled due to mid-season withdrawal of Hidalgo La Fiera.
 Postponed due to travel issues caused by "recent acts of violence" in northern Mexico

References

External links
Official website
Saltillo Rancho Seco at Facebook
Saltillo Rancho Seco at El Diario de Coahuila
Saltillo Rancho Seco at Vanguardia

Saltillo Ranco Seco
Saltillo Rancho Seco
Saltillo Rancho Seco 2014
Saltillo Rancho Seco 2014
Saltillo Rancho Seco 2014